The second series of I'm a Celebrity... Get Me out of Here! was broadcast on ITV from 28 April to 12 May 2003. Ant & Dec presented the main show on ITV, whilst Mark Durden-Smith and former contestant Tara Palmer-Tomkinson hosted the spin-off show I'm A Celebrity... Get Me Out of Here... Now! on ITV2.

The winner of this series was former English cricketer Phil Tufnell, who overcame John Fashanu and Linda Barker in the final.

The series was sponsored by the energy drink V.

Contestants
The show began with ten celebrity contestants:

Results and elimination

 Indicates that the celebrity received the most votes
 Indicates that the celebrity was immediately eliminated (no bottom two/three)
 Indicates that the celebrity was in the bottom two/three in the public vote

Notes
 There was no elimination on Day 9 due to Danniella walking out of the jungle.

Bushtucker Trials
The contestants take part in daily trials to earn food

 The public voted for who they wanted to face the trial
 The contestants decided who did which trial
 The trial was compulsory and neither the public or celebrities decided who took part

Star count

Ratings 
All ratings are taken from the UK Programme Ratings website, BARB.

Series average = 8.55 million viewers.

References 

2003 British television seasons
02